Digital broadcast radio in Australia uses the DAB+ standard and is available in Sydney, Melbourne, Brisbane, Perth, Adelaide, Canberra, Darwin and Hobart. However, after 11 years, regional large cities such as Townsville and Ballarat still do not have DAB. The national government owned television/radio networks, the ABC and SBS, and the commercial radio stations in each market provide many of their services and a few digital-only services on the digital platform. Australia uses the AAC+ codec provided with upgraded DAB+ standard.

History
Despite testing in Sydney and Melbourne from as early as 1999, the first genuine plan for digital broadcast radio was released in October 2005, as Helen Coonan, the then Australian Minister for Communications, Information Technology and the Arts, announced that Australia would adopt the Eureka 147 system. The Australian Government had set a launch date for digital broadcast radio in the six state capital cities, originally 1 January 2009, but this launch date was subsequently shifted back to no later than 1 July 2009 and the list of cities starting digital broadcast radio excluded Hobart. The peak industry body, Commercial Radio Australia, began coordinating the tests as well as organising the commercial multiplexes. The Australian Film Television and Radio School supported the development of digital radio by holding training seminars and test broadcasts in various cities, organised by then Head of Radio Steve Ahern.

The major radio networks commenced a staged roll-out of commercial DAB+ services during May 2009 with Perth launching on 4 May 2009; Melbourne on 11 May 2009; Adelaide on 20 May 2009; Brisbane on 25 May 2009; and Sydney on 30 May 2009 (later delayed to 15 June due to weather conditions and kept on low power until 30 June). The roll-out of DAB+ services by the Government-owned ABC and SBS networks was delayed until 1 July 2009 due to funding delays and management issues. Testing has been planned for other major cities, with a trial multiplex in Canberra commencing broadcasting on 14 July 2010, and a trial multiplex running in Darwin since 13 August 2010. Similar trials are being considered for Townsville and Hobart, and, as of December 2010, commercial broadcasters in regional markets have begun planning to introduce digital broadcast radio into regional population centres, possibly as soon as 2011 or 2012. However, it is expected that it will be some years before digital broadcast radio is extended to the bulk of the Australian continent. Australia's vast distances and low population density are not well suited to the propagation characteristics of DAB+ and it is therefore likely that a standard other than DAB+ will be adopted for serving areas outside the major cities (leading to customer acceptance issues with receivers that can only receive one of the likely two standards).

Community digital broadcast radio services were rolled out to capital cities in late 2010 to May 2011 and were formally launched in May 2011. The roll out of community digital broadcast radio services represents the largest ever infrastructure project conducted by the community broadcasting sector in Australia. The project was managed by the Community Broadcasting Association of Australia.

On 14 December 2017, the ABC and SBS services in Canberra moved to a separate multiplex (both on 9C, 206.352 MHz) providing the same services as in Adelaide, Brisbane, Melbourne, Perth and Sydney. Services in Hobart began in 2019, as a national multiplex for ABC and SBS stations launched on 19 March 2018 and commercial multiplex launched on 3 April 2019.

On 23 December 2019, two commercial stations in Mandurah launched its digital service on a new multiplex 8C (199.360 MHz), becoming the first market in regional Australia to have DAB services. This was followed by the launch of digital radio in Gold Coast on multiplex 9D (208.064 MHz) on 4 April 2022.

Current services

National broadcasters
The ABC and SBS operate digital broadcast radio services in all current DAB+ broadcasting markets on frequency block 9C (206.352 MHz). While most services are national, the ABC provides local ABC Local Radio stations for their respective locations.

The local radio services are mostly a simulcast of their AM radio equivalents (FM in the case of Darwin); however, alternate programming is aired pre-empting most sports coverage (which is moved to digital-only station ABC Sport). This programming is also on the ABC's online streams, where sporting rights may prevent international coverage. The ABC also has a number of digital-only radio stations, including ABC Jazz, Double J, ABC Country, and special-events station ABC Extra, which is used to provide additional coverage for special events which may otherwise not be able to be covered.

Commercial and community radio

Each region with access to digital broadcast radio has a number of multiplexes set aside for commercial and community radio services. In these multiplexes, two-ninths of the bandwidth are reserved for community broadcasters, while the rest is used for commercial broadcasters. Sydney, Melbourne and Brisbane have been provided with two such multiplexes, which broadcast on frequency blocks 9A (202.928 MHz) and 9B (204.640 MHz), allowing a greater number of stations, while other cities only use a single multiplex: 8C (199.360 MHz) in Mandurah, 8D (201.072 MHz) in Canberra, 9A (202.928 MHz) in Darwin and Hobart, 9B (204.640 MHz) in Adelaide and Perth, and 9D (208.064 MHz) in Gold Coast.

Commercial services on digital broadcast radio include simulcasts of both AM and FM stations, as well as new digital-only services. While most commercial radio services in Australia are provided by a small number of companies, there are no truly national commercial stations. However, since these commercial broadcasters have been given extra bandwidth on the digital platform, digital-only stations launched, including Triple M Classic Rock (Southern Cross Austereo) The Edge Digital (ARN) and NovaNation (formerly DMG),

Community Radio stations with a citywide licence have reserved spectrum, equalling 2/9s of the capacity on each commercial multiplex. The Federal Government promised $10.1 million in funding to help community broadcasters with the costs of beginning digital broadcasts. During late 2010 and early 2011 most of the eligible community stations in Melbourne and several in Sydney and Brisbane began test transmissions. Melbourne's community radio stations officially launched their digital services on 14 April 2011, followed by Adelaide's community radio stations on 15 April 2011, Brisbane's on 14 May 2011, and Sydney's on 24 May 2011. Services in Perth are broadcasting in digital. Community Digital Broadcast Radio services were formally launched by Senator Stephen Conroy, Minister for Broadband, Communications and the Digital Economy on 13 May 2011 in Melbourne.

Adelaide

Brisbane

Canberra

Darwin

Gold Coast

Hobart

Mandurah

Melbourne
Listing current at 13 November 2020

Perth

Sydney 
Listing current at 13 November 2020

References

External links
Community Digital Radio - Radius Website - Community Broadcasting Association of Australia's digital radio website
Digital Radio at the ABC website
Digital Radio at the SBS website
Digital Radio at the radioinfo website
Digital Radio Plus Website